The Senegal Fed Cup team represents Senegal in Fed Cup tennis competition and are governed by the Fédération Senegalaise de Tennis.  They have not competed since 1995.

History
Senegal competed in its first Fed Cup in 1982.  They have lost all nine of their ties to date.

See also
Fed Cup
Senegal Davis Cup team

External links

Billie Jean King Cup teams
Fed Cup
Fed Cup